Mommet may refer to:
Scarecrow
Poppet